Juuti is a Finnish surname. Notable people with the surname include:

 Jaakko Juuti (born 1987), Finnish footballer
 Sakari Juuti (born 1931), Finnish diplomat and lawyer
 Olivia Yli-Juuti (born 2001), Finnish gymnast

Surnames of Finnish origin